Iowa Highway 930 (Iowa 930) is a  unsigned highway in Boone County, Iowa. During the 1960s, U.S. Highway 30 (US 30) in central Iowa was reconstructed to the south of where it ran, bypassing the cities of Marshalltown, Ames, and Boone. Upon completion, the entire old route of US 30 became Iowa 930. Gradually, most of Iowa 930 was turned back to the respective counties and cities except for the portion in Boone County.

Route description
Iowa 930 begins at two half interchanges with US 30 in eastern Boone County. The two directions meet at the corner of 230th Street and X Avenue in the Boone County road grid.  The highway heads east on 230th Street for  where it ends at the county line with Story County. Coming from the north along the county line is County Road R38 (CR R38). The Iowa 930 roadway continues in Story County as CR R38 and is known as Lincoln Way.

Major intersections

References

External links

930
Transportation in Boone County, Iowa
U.S. Route 30